The Waeve (stylized as The WAEVE) is an English band formed in London, in 2021 by singer-songwriters and musicians Graham Coxon and Rose Elinor Dougall. They describe their music as "a liquid meeting of musical minds and talents. A powerful elixir of cinematic British folk-rock, post-punk, organic songwriting and freefall jamming." They released their debut album, The Waeve, in 2023.

History

Background and formation (2020–2021)
Graham Coxon and Rose Elinor Dougall first met in 2004 during a gig at Islington's the Buffalo Bar, in which Coxon was an attendee and Dougall was performing with the Pipettes. However, a brief chat and Dougall convincing Coxon to buy her a quadruple brandy and coke was the extent of that encounter.

They became properly reacquainted in December 2020 when both were on the bill of the Live for Beirut 2.0 benefit show at the Jazz Cafe in London to raise money for victims of the Beirut warehouse explosion earlier that year.

Following the gig, Dougall suggested to Coxon that they should write a song together. After exchanging emails over Christmas, at the start of 2021 they met up for some writing sessions and quickly came up with song ideas in a few weeks. Feeling that the music they were making had a shared identity, they decided to record an album and brought in James Ford to help flesh out the production.

As both Dougall and Coxon are Pisceans and their complicated feelings towards Britain inspired their music with numerous references in the lyrics to water and sea, they decided to call themselves The Waeve using the old English spelling.

Going public and releasing The Waeve (2022–present)
On 20 April 2022, The Waeve officially went public by announcing that they would be playing their first live show and releasing their debut single, "Something Pretty", the following month.

On 6 September 2022, The Waeve shared details of their upcoming self-titled debut album while also releasing the first single from it, "Can I Call You". The second single "Drowning" followed on 24 October, along with an announcement of a U.K. tour scheduled for March 2023. The Waeve then released third single "Kill Me Again" on 24 November 2022, and on 19 January 2023 they put out "Over and Over Again", the fourth and final single leading up to the release of the album.

On 3 February 2023, The Waeve was released to positive reviews, including from the likes of Clash, Uncut and The Quietus.

Musical styles and influences
The Waeve have cited Sandy Denny, John and Beverley Martyn, Kevin Ayers and Van der Graaf Generator as reference points for their debut album.

Band members
 Graham Coxon – lead vocals, guitar, saxophone (2021–present)
 Rose Elinor Dougall – lead vocals, keyboards (2021–present)

Touring members
 Emma Smith – violin, saxophone (2022–present)
 Joe Chilton – bass (2022–present)
 Thomas White – drums (2022–present)

Discography
 The Waeve (2023)

References

English folk rock groups
English progressive rock groups
Musical groups established in 2021